Calgary Sports and soccer team. is one of four (Calgary, Edmonton, Saskatoon and Winnipeg) of Canada's newest professional soccer teams participating in the Canadian Major Indoor Soccer League.

Notable coaches 
 Troye Flannery (2010)
 Dave Randall (2009)
 Jamey Glasnovic (2008)

2008 Calgary United F.C. Schedule

Regular Season Schedule

Year-By-Year

Year-By-Year Stats

Home Arena
Calgary United's first home was the 6,475-seat Stampede Corral, an ice hockey and rodeo arena that is also used in the annual Calgary Stampede. Beginning with the 2008 season, Calgary United moved to the Subway Soccer Centre.

Current roster

Honours
 Cardel Cup Champions - 2008

Notes and references

United
Canadian Major Indoor Soccer League teams